The HQ-9 is a long-range semi-active radar homing (SARH) surface-to-air missile (SAM) developed by the People's Republic of China. The naval variant is the HHQ-9.

Description
The HQ-9 is a derivative of the Russian S-300. Justin Bronk describes the missile as a "hybrid design based on a Russian SA-20 but with radar, seeker head and C2 elements heavily influenced by American and Israeli technology." Early HQ-9s may use track-via-missile guidance developed from a United States MIM-104 Patriot missile purchased from Israel or Germany.

According to a 2001 article from Defence International, the HQ-9 is 6.8 m. long with a mass of nearly two tons. The diameters of the first and second stages are 700 mm and 560 mm, respectively. The warhead mass is 180 kg, and the maximum speed is Mach 4.2. The HQ-9 may use fire-control radars from other Chinese SAM systems.

Variants

 Air defense
 

  — Naval surface-launched variant.
  — Improved version, first tested in 1999 and service entry in 2001.
  — Improved version with 300 km range and added passive infrared seeker. Reportedly tested in February 2006.

 Ballistic missile defense and anti-satellite
  – Anti-ballistic missile variant, reportedly designed to counter ballistic missiles that have a range of between 1000 and 3000 km. It targets ballistic missiles in their midcourse and terminal phases, and it is comparable to the US THAAD. The missile may have "begun preliminary operations" by 2018.

 Export
  – Export variant with a range of 125 km. May be fitted with YLC-20 passive radar against stealthy targets. May use the HT-233 target-acquisition radar, Type 120 low-altitude search radar, and Type 305A AESA search radar.
  – Export variant with a range of 250 km.
  – Custom variant for Pakistan. Range of over 100 km for interception against aircraft and around 25 km against cruise missiles.

Foreign interest

Turkey
The HQ-9 was a contender in Turkey's T-LORAMIDS program, and it was reportedly selected as the winner in September 2013. The United States responded by blocking funds to integrate the Chinese system into NATO defenses. However, through 2013 there was no confirmation that the deal had been finalized. In February 2015, the Grand National Assembly of Turkey was informed by the Ministry of National Defence that the evaluation of bids was complete and that the chosen system would be used by Turkey without integration with NATO; the system was not explicitly named. However, other Turkish officials reported that no winner had been selected. Later in the month, Turkish officials revealed that negotiations were ongoing with multiple bidders; the Chinese bid had not yet satisfied requirements concerning technology transfer. In March 2015, a China Daily article reported that it was "well-known that the Chinese FD-2000 system, a HQ-9 model for export, was chosen for the contract with Turkey in 2013" based on comments made by a CPMIEC representative at the 2015 Langkawi International Maritime and Aerospace Exhibition; the article was misleadingly called "Missile sale to Turkey confirmed." In November 2015, Turkey confirmed it would not purchase the HQ-9, opting for an indigenously developed system instead.

Operating history

China
In July 2015, the PLA deployed the HQ-9 close to Kashmir along the LAC in preparation for a potential territorial conflict with India. The air defense systems were sent to the Hetian airfield located south of the Xinjiang region, which is only 260 km away from the Kashmir region. According to Kanwa Defense Review, a Chinese-language magazine based in Canada, radar vehicles of HQ-9 air defense missiles have been spotted at the base and assessed that they are intended to defend China's western border from any potential air strikes launched by the Indian Air Force.

On 17 February 2016, the Taiwan defense ministry said it had "learned of an air defence missile system deployed" by the Chinese on Woody Island in the Paracel Islands. It would not say how many missiles had been deployed or when, but told the BBC they would be capable of targeting civilian and military aircraft from Vietnam or the Philippines. The commander of the US Pacific Fleet confirmed the deployment to Reuters news agency. Adm Harry Harris said such a move would be "a militarisation of the South China Sea in ways" Chinese military chairman Xi Jinping had pledged not to make.

Deployment in South China Sea
Japanese Chief Cabinet Secretary Yoshihide Suga said there were "serious concerns" over China's "unilateral move to change the status quo" in the region, and "we cannot accept this fact." Satellite images show a close-up of a section of beach, the shape of which resembles the northern coastline of Woody/Yongxing Island in the Paracels as it appears on other images, and point out two missile batteries. Each battery is made up of four launchers and two control vehicles. Two of the launchers appear to have been erected, says the report. Fox News quoted a US defence official as saying the missiles appeared to be the HQ-9 air defence system, with a range of about 200 km (125 miles).

Pakistan
The Pakistan Army operates the HQ-9/P variant. Negotiations for the purchase of the HQ-9 and HQ-16 by Pakistan began in early 2015. The missiles officially entered service on October 14, 2021.

Operators

People's Liberation Army Air Force - 180 HQ-9, 80 HQ-9B as of 2020
People's Liberation Army Navy - 16 HQ-9, 16 HQ-9B as of 2020 (land based launcher).

Royal Moroccan Army - Four batteries of FD-2000B purchased in 2016. The first battery was expected to be delivered in 2020 or 2021.

Turkmen Air Force

Uzbekistan Air and Air Defence Forces

Pakistan Army
Pakistan Air Force

See also
 Surface-to-air missile
Similar systems
 Terminal High Altitude Area Defense (HQ-19, SC-19)
 MIM-104 Patriot
 S-300 (missile)
 Medium Extended Air Defense System
 XRSAM
 HISAR (surface to air missile system)
 Aster
 David's Sling
Related lists
 List of missiles
 List of surface-to-air missiles

References

Citations

Sources

External links
HQ-9 missile launch photos, Chinese Air Force  AirForceWorld.com
FD-2000 long range air defense missile system(Army recognition)
HQ-9 medium-to-long range air defense missile system(Army recognition)
HQ-9 / FT-2000 SAM Sinodefence
Naval HQ-9 SAM Sinodefence
HQ-9 Missilethreat.com
CHINA OFFERS FD-2000 / HQ-9, FK-1000 AND FL-3000N MISSILE SYSTEMS TO THAILAND 6 November 2013

Missile defense
Surface-to-air missiles of the People's Republic of China
Weapons of the People's Republic of China
Naval surface-to-air missiles
Anti-ballistic missiles of the People's Republic of China
Military equipment introduced in the 1990s